Fresia is a surname. Notable people with the surname include:

 Attilio Fresia (1891–1923), Italian footballer
 Vincenzo Fresia (1888–1946), Italian footballer and manager

See also 

 Fresa
 Fresia (disambiguation)